Welcome to My Life is an American animated short pilot created by Elizabeth Ito for Cartoon Network, and produced at Cartoon Network Studios. It was first screened at Annecy Festival in 2015 (along with Apple & Onion), and then released online through the official Cartoon Network YouTube channel on April 7, 2017, which has 5.5 million views as of March 14, 2021, making it the second most viewed short after Infinity Train.

Story 
The pilot follows a day in the life of Douglas (Doug Ito), otherwise known by his friends as T-Kesh, a monster, and his experience trying to fit in at his high school. It starts off with Douglas introducing himself while a disembodied voice (Elizabeth Ito) asks him a series of questions, and continues on following Douglas through a mockumentary or docucomedy style filming his entire day in school. During his lunch period, Douglas points at someone with no ill intentions and claims that they are the human version of himself. That person takes offense and states that they will fight after school. Douglas while on his way to fight runs into his friend Lucas (Cole Sanchez): he surprised by fact that Douglas is going to fight somebody asks who is he going to fight, which then leads him to realize the Bully attends his church. Lucas goes to talk to the Bully (whose name is revealed to be Ian, as by the name of his voice actor Ian Jones-Quartey), to deescalate the situation. Leading Ian to realize being the human version of Douglas isn't so bad in turn, Douglas apologizes for pointing at him. This finally even leads to the start of a friendship between them.

Production
Welcome to My Life was created by Elizabeth Ito, former writer/storyboard artist and supervising director on Adventure Time. Before Cartoon Network hired her to work on that hit series in 2010, she created back sometime in 2004 a short of the same name and posted online in November 2007 on YouTube, as her senior year project while she studied at CalArts. It was presented as part of Nicktoons Film Festival in the same year, and as the current version, the plot takes place as an animated documentary about a family of monsters trying to lead a normal American life. For both versions, the monster family are based on Ito's own family who are part of her life and career, which in turn were also the inspiration of them; they also gave their voices for the monsters. It was dedicated to the loving memory of Ito's dog, Bun Bun, as he died before the production of the student short at CalArts.

Despite it being a failed pilot for the channel, Welcome to My Life would have been the third Cartoon Network show to be solely created by a woman after Steven Universe and ''Summer Camp Island.

References

2010s American television specials
Cartoon Network original programming
Cartoon Network Studios pilots and shorts
Television pilots not picked up as a series